The 1945 Ashton-under-Lyne by-election was a by-election held on 2 October 1945 for the British House of Commons constituency of Ashton-under-Lyne.

The by-election was triggered by the elevation to the peerage of the town's Labour Party Member of Parliament (MP) William Jowitt, who was ennobled as Baron Jowitt.

The result was a victory for the Labour candidate Hervey Rhodes, who held the seat with over 50% of the votes, with a swing in the Labour Party's direction.

Votes

References

See also 
 List of United Kingdom by-elections
 Ashton-under-Lyne constituency
 1920 Ashton-under-Lyne by-election
 1928 Ashton-under-Lyne by-election
 1931 Ashton-under-Lyne by-election
 1939 Ashton-under-Lyne by-election

By-elections to the Parliament of the United Kingdom in Greater Manchester constituencies
1945 elections in the United Kingdom
1945 in England
1940s in Lancashire
By-elections to the Parliament of the United Kingdom in Lancashire constituencies
Ashton-under-Lyne
Elections in Tameside
October 1945 events in the United Kingdom